Aladashvili is a Georgian surname. Notable people with the surname include:

Kakhaber Aladashvili (born 1983), Georgian footballer 
Konstantin Aladashvili (born 1977), Georgian bobsledder and skeleton racer
 

Georgian-language surnames